Albert John Luthuli ( – 21 July 1967) was a South African anti-apartheid activist, traditional leader, and politician who served as the President-General of the African National Congress from 1952 until his death in 1967.

Luthuli was born to a Zulu family in 1898 at a Seventh-day Adventist mission in Bulawayo, Rhodesia (now Zimbabwe). He returned to his family's ancestral home of Groutville in 1908 to attend school under the care of his uncle. After graduating from high school with a teaching degree, Luthuli became principal of a small school in Natal where he was the sole teacher. Luthuli's teaching was recognized by the government, and he was offered a bursary to study for the Higher Teacher's Diploma at Adams College. After the completion of his studies in 1922, he accepted a teaching position at Adam's College where he was one of the first African teachers. In 1928, he became the secretary of the Natal Native Teachers' Association, then its president in 1933.

Luthuli's first entry into South African politics and the anti-apartheid movement started in 1935 when he was elected chief of the Umvoti River Reserve in Groutville. As chief, he was exposed to the injustices facing many Africans due to the South African government's increasingly segregationist policies. This segregation would later evolve into apartheid, a form of institutionalized racial segregation following the National Party's election victory in 1948. Luthuli joined the African National Congress (ANC) in 1944 and was elected the provincial president of the Natal branch in 1951. A year later in 1952, Luthuli led the Defiance Campaign to protest the pass laws and other laws of apartheid. As a result, the government removed him from his chief position as he refused to choose between being a member of the ANC or a chief at Groutville. In the same year, he was elected President-General of the ANC. After the Sharpeville massacre, where sixty-nine Africans were killed, leaders within the ANC such as Nelson Mandela believed the organization should take up armed resistance against the government. Luthuli was against the use of violence, but as time passed, he gradually accepted it; however, he stayed committed to nonviolence on a personal level. Following four banning orders, the imprisonment and exile of his political allies, and the banning of the ANC, Luthuli's power as President-General gradually waned. The subsequent creation of uMkhonto we Sizwe, the ANC's paramilitary wing, marked the anti-apartheid movement's shift from nonviolence to an armed struggle.

Inspired by his Christian faith and the nonviolent methods used by Gandhi, Luthuli was praised for his dedication to nonviolent resistance against apartheid as well as his vision of a non-racial South African society. In 1961, Luthuli was awarded the 1960 Nobel Peace Prize for his role in leading the nonviolent anti-apartheid movement. Luthuli's supporters brand him as a global icon of peace similar to Gandhi and Martin Luther King Jr, the latter of which claimed to be a follower and admirer of Luthuli. He formed multi-racial alliances with the South African Indian Congress and the white Congress of Democrats, which drew frequent backlash from Africanists in the ANC. The Africanist bloc believed that Africans should not ally themselves with other races due to them being the most disadvantaged race under apartheid. This schism led to the creation of the Pan-Africanist Congress led by Robert Sobukwe.

Early life 

Albert Luthuli was born at the Solusi Mission Station, a Seventh-day Adventist missionary station, in 1898 to John and Mtonya Luthuli (née Gumede) who had settled in the Bulawayo area of Rhodesia (now Zimbabwe). He was the youngest of three children and had two brothers, Alfred Nsusana and Mpangwa, who died at birth. Luthuli's father died when he was about six months old, and Luthuli had no recollection of him. His father's death led to him being mainly raised by his mother Mtonya, who had spent her childhood in the royal household of King Cetshwayo in Zululand.

Before her marriage to John Luthuli, Mtonya became a Christian, lived within the precincts of the American Board Mission, where she learned how to read, and was a devoted reader of the Bible. After their marriage, Luthuli's father left Natal and went to Rhodesia during the Second Matabele War to serve in some capacity with the Rhodesian forces. When the war ended, John stayed in Rhodesia, attached to a Seventh-day Adventist mission near Bulawayo as an interpreter and evangelist. Mtonya and Alfred then traveled to Rhodesia to reunite with John, where Luthuli was born soon after.

Luthuli's lineage is often traced back to his paternal grandparents Ntaba ka Madunjini and Titsi Mthethwa, who were born in the early nineteenth century and were among the first converts of Aldin Grout, a missionary from the American Board of Commissioners for Foreign Missions (ABM), which was based near the Umvoti River north of Durban. Ntaba and Titsi were one of the many Africans that resisted incorporation into the Zulu state founded by Shaka. In 1860, the Umvoti community, known as the abasemakholweni (converted Christians), elected Ntaba as chief, beginning a family tradition that followed Ntaba's brother, son Martin, and grandson Albert.

Youth 

Around 1908 or 1909, the Seventh-day Adventists wanted to begin missionary activities in Natal. They asked Luthuli's brother, Alfred, to return to work as an interpreter. Luthuli and his mother followed, and left Rhodesia to return to South Africa. Luthuli would stay in the Vryheid district of Northern Natal, where they lived on a farm of a Seventh-day Adventist. As there was no school, Luthuli would tend the mules of the missionaries until his mother sent him to be educated in Groutville under the care of his uncle. Groutville was a small community of Christian peasant farmers and was attached to the mission station of the American Board of Commissioners for Foreign Missions (ABM). The ABM was a Congregationalist mission that began their work in Southern Africa in the 1830s. Missionary Aldin Grout began his mission in the village of Umvoti; after his death in 1894 it would be renamed Groutville in his honor.

Albert joined the household of his uncle, Chief Martin Luthuli. Martin was the first democratically elected chief of Groutville. Outside of his chieftaincy, Martin founded the Natal Native Congress in 1901, and in 1912 he took part in the founding of the South African Native National Congress (now the African National Congress). As chief, Martin was guardian over many relatives and children, which led to Luthuli having a pleasant childhood with friends of his own age. In Martin's Zulu and Christian household, Luthuli would perform duties expected of a boy in traditional Zulu society such as fetching water, herding, and building fires. He would also go to school for the first time. Under Martin's care, Luthuli was also provided with an early knowledge of traditional African politics and affairs, which aided him in his future career as a traditional chief.

Education 

Luthuli's mother, Mtonya, returned to Groutville and Luthuli returned to her care. They lived in a brand-new house built by his brother, Alfred, on the site where their grandfather, Ntaba, had once lived. In order to be able to send her son to boarding school, Mtonya worked long hours in the fields of the land she owned. She would also take in laundry from European families in the township of Stanger to earn the necessary money for school. Luthuli was then able to go to the Ohlange Institute after he had passed Standard 4 at the ABM mission school in 1914.

Ohlange was founded by Dr. John Dube, who was the school principal at the time Luthuli attended. Dube was educated in America but returned to South Africa to open the Ohlange Institute to provide an education to black children. He was the first President-General of the South African Native National Congress and founded the first Zulu-language newspaper Ilanga lase Natal. Luthuli joined the ANC in 1944, partially out of respect to his former school principal.

Luthuli describes his time at Ohlange as "rough-and-tumble" due to the outbreak of World War I; rationing and wartime conditions brought a shortage of food to the African population. This shortage reached the Ohlange Institute and there was a frequent scarcity of food. After attending Ohlange for only two terms, Luthuli was then transferred to Edendale, a Methodist institution near Pietermaritzburg, the capital of Natal. It was at Edendale where Luthuli participated in his first act of civil disobedience. Along with other students, he joined a student strike and stay-away to protest against a form of punishment implemented by a teacher who would make boys carry heavy stones a long distance. This would then damage their uniforms, which many could not afford. The demonstration failed and Luthuli along with the rest of the strikers were punished by the school. At Edendale, Luthuli developed a passion for teaching and went on to graduate with a teaching degree in 1917.

Teaching 

Around the age of nineteen years old, Luthuli's first job after graduation came as a principal at a rural intermediate school in Blaauwbosch, located in the Natal midlands. The school was small, and Luthuli was the sole teacher working there. While teaching at Blaauwbosch, Luthuli lived with a Methodist's family. As there were no Congregational churches around him, he became the student of a local Methodist minister, the Reverend Mthembu. He was confirmed in the Methodist church and later became a lay preacher.

Luthuli proved himself to be a good teacher and the Natal Department of Education offered him a bursary in 1920 to study for a Higher Teacher's Diploma at Adams College. Following the completion of his two years of study at Adams College, he was offered another bursary, this time to study at the University of Fort Hare in the Eastern Cape. He refused, as he wanted to earn a salary to take care of his ageing mother, which led him to accept a teaching position at Adams College where he and Z. K. Matthews were one of the first African teachers at the school. At Adams College, Luthuli would teach Zulu history, music, and literature. It was also at Adams College where Luthuli would meet his future wife, Nokukhanya Bhengu, a fellow teacher and the granddaughter of a Zulu chief. Luthuli was dedicated to bringing quality education to African children and led the Teachers' College at Adams College where he trained future teachers and travelled to different institutions to teach students.

Early political activity

Natal Native Teachers' Association 

In 1928, Albert Luthuli was elected as secretary of the Natal Native Teachers' Association. He served under the presidency of his friend and colleague at Adams College, Z. K. Matthews. In 1933, he became president of the association. The association had three goals: improving the working conditions for African teachers, motivating members to broaden their skills, and encouraging members to participate in leisure activities such as sports, music and social gatherings. Despite making little progress in achieving their stated goals, the association is remembered for their vigorous opposition to the Chief Inspector for Native Education in Natal, Charles Loram, and his proposal that Africans be educated in "practical functions" and left to "develop along their own lines". This position served as the ideological basis for the National Party's Bantu Education policy.

The Zulu Language and Cultural Society 

Disillusioned with the lack of progress with the Natal Native Teachers' Association, Luthuli refocused his efforts in 1935 by co-founding an auxiliary of the Teachers' Association, the Zulu Language and Cultural Society. Zulu king, Dinizulu, served as one of the society's patrons, and John Dube served as the first president. Luthuli described the purpose of the society as a means to preserve what is valuable to Zulu culture while removing the inappropriate practices and beliefs. Luthuli's role in the society was short-lived as he had to serve as chief in Groutville. His departure prevented him from having a direct role with the Society, and subsequently, the society's goals deviated from their original purpose. According to historian Shula Marks, the primary goal of the Zulu Language and Cultural Society was to gain recognition from the government and have the Zulu royal family be recognized as Paramount. The preservation of Zulu tradition and custom was a secondary goal. Grants and gifts from the South African Native Affairs Department as well as the society's involvement with the Zulu royal house led to its demise as it collapsed in 1946. The inability of the Teachers' Association and the Zulu Society to lead to any meaningful change caused Luthuli to reject the government as a co-operative partner.

Cane Growers' Association 
The 1936 Sugar Act limited production of sugar in order to keep the price from falling. A quota system was implemented, and, for African cane growers, it was severely limiting. As a response Luthuli decided to revive the Groutville Cane Growers' Association of which he became chairman. The association was used to make collective bargaining and advocacy more effective. The association achieved a significant victory: an amendment was made to the Sugar Act that allowed African growers to have a comprehensive quota. This meant if one farmer didn't produce, others were able to get their cane on the market instead of watching it rot.

Luthuli then founded the Natal and Zululand Bantu Cane Growers' Association, where he served as chairman. The association brought nearly all African sugarcane producers into one union. The association enjoyed a few small victories such as ensuring indirect representation to the Central Board through a "non-European" advisory board in matters related to sugar production, processing, and marketing. The structural nature of South African society triumphed over the association's interests, and they proved to be little match for the white canegrowers' associations. Like his time with the Teachers' Association, Luthuli grew disillusioned with the Growers' Association lack of achievement. Luthuli believed that whatever political role he was involved in, the stubbornness and hostility of the government undermined progress. As late as 1951, Luthuli continued to support black cane growers and continued to be the sole black representative on the central board until 1953.

Chief of Groutville 

In 1933, Luthuli was asked to succeed his uncle, Martin, as chief of the Umvoti River Reserve. He took two years to make his decision. His salary at Adams College was enough to send home to support his family, and if he accepted the chieftainship, he would earn less than one-fifth of his current salary. Furthermore, to give up a job at Adams College, which served Africans all over South Africa, to become a chief appeared to be a move from a multiethnic experience to a more insular existence. Luthuli chose the option of chieftainship and claimed that money, fame, and power were not his goals. He was elected Chief in 1935 and moved to Groutville at the end of the year. He commenced his duties on January 1936 and would continue until he was deposed by the South African government in 1952.

Some chiefs used their government backing to act as tyrants while enriching themselves and their families, which was commonly done by accepting bribes or charging dubious fees. Luthuli chose to govern with an inclusive democratic stance, which he believed Zulu traditional governance to be based upon. He believed a chief should remain responsive to the desires of their people. Luthuli was seen as a chief of his people: one community member remembered Luthuli as a "man of the people who had a very strong influence over the community. He was a people's chief." Luthuli frequently included women in his democratic consultations and facilitated their economic participation by ignoring the government prohibitions on their operation of shebeens.

The position of Africans in the reserves continued to regress as a result of the laws passed that controlled their social mobility. The Hertzog Bills were introduced a year after Luthuli was elected chief and were instrumental in the restriction and control of Africans. The first of these bills, the Native Representation Bill, removed Africans from the voters' roll in the Cape and created the Natives' Representation Council (NRC). The second of these bills, the Natives Land and Trust Bill, limited the land that could be occupied by the 12 million Africans to 13 per cent, while the remaining 87 mainly went to the white population of just under 3 million in 1936. Lack of land and poor agricultural technology negatively affected the people of Groutville, and the government's policies continued to create a shortage of land, education, and money, which stunted the potential achievements of the people. Luthuli viewed the conditions of Groutville as a microcosm that affected all Africans in South Africa.

Natives Representative Council 

In 1937, the Native Representative Council was formed to compensate the African population from their loss of limited franchise in the Cape Province following the passage of the Hertzog Bills in 1936.

In 1946, Luthuli assumed council duty in the Native Representative Council (NRC), an advisory body to the government. Luthuli brought his long-standing complaints about the poor quality of African land to the NRC meetings. With the support of his fellow councilors, Luthuli protested the government's use of force towards a large African mineworkers' strike. Luthuli claimed that the government was deaf to African complaints in response to the growing segregationist measures, and African councilors then adjourned in protest. He would later say that the NRC was a "toy telephone" requiring him to "shout a little louder" to no one. The NRC was brought together once more but adjourned again indefinitely. Its members refused to co-operate with the government and rendered it defunct. The NRC never met after that point and the government dissolved it in 1952.

Luthuli frequently addressed the criticism from his fellow black South Africans who believed that serving in the Native Representative Council would lead to nothing but talk, and that the NRC was a form of deceit served by the South African government. He often agreed with these sentiments, but he and other contemporary African leaders believed that Africans should represent themselves in all structures created by the government, even if only to change them. He was determined to take the demands and grievances of his people to the government. However, like others before him, Luthuli realized that his efforts proved futile in the end. In an interview with Drum Magazine in May 1953, Luthuli said that joining the NRC gave White South Africans "a last chance to prove their good faith" but they "had not done so".

President of the Natal ANC 
When John Dube suffered a stroke in 1945, A. W. G. Champion succeeded him as president of the Natal ANC following an election. Luthuli went on to serve on Champion's executive. Members of the ANC Youth League, which was founded in 1944, grew discontent with Champion's leadership. Champion would frequently fail to implement strategies and programmes set forth by the national ANC or Youth League, which made the Natal ANC lag behind. Members of the Youth League in Natal nominated Luthuli for Natal president in 1951 as they viewed him as a new brand of leadership. Luthuli and Champion were the two nominees for the election; Luthuli was elected president of the Natal ANC by a small majority.

In Luthuli's first appearance as Natal ANC president at the ANC's national conference, he pleaded for more time to be given to the Natal ANC in preparation for the planned Defiance Campaign, a large act of civil disobedience by non-white South Africans. The ANC members did not support his excuse and he was heckled and dubbed a coward. However, Luthuli had no prior knowledge of this planned campaign and only found out about it as he was traveling to Bloemfontein, where the ANC's national conference was held. Many of the details about the campaign were given to his predecessor, A. W.G Champion. The Natal ANC made agreements to make their preparations for the Defiance Campaign, which was slated for the latter half of 1952, and participate as soon as they were ready.

Defiance Campaign 

Preparation for the Defiance Campaign began on 6 April, the date the Defiance Campaign was originally supposed to begin. The day was mostly used as a warm-up for the Campaign proper, which was to be held on 26 June 1952. Large meetings were held in city centres across South Africa at the same time many white South Africans were observing the three-hundredth anniversary of Jan van Riebeeck's landing at the Cape. In Cape Town, Port Elizabeth, East London, Pretoria, and Durban, crowds of up to ten thousand people attended demonstrations in support of the upcoming Defiance Campaign.

Beginning in June, around 8500 volunteers of the ANC and South African Indian Congress, who were carefully selected to follow the method of nonviolent resistance, deliberately set out to break the laws of apartheid. Using strategies inspired by Gandhi, the Defiance Campaign required a strict adherence to a policy of nonviolence. Africans, Indians, and Coloureds used amenities marked "Europeans Only"; they sat on benches and used reserved station platforms, carriages in trains, and post office counters; and occupied pieces of land reserved for whites. Until the end of October, the Defiance Campaign remained nonviolent and disciplined. As the movement gained momentum, violence suddenly flared. The outbreaks were not a planned part of the campaign, and many, including Luthuli, believe it to be the work of provocateur agents. The police, frustrated by the passive resistors, acted severely as the outbreaks of violence sparked chain reactions. This led to dozens of Africans being shot.

The Defiance Campaign did little to change the mind of the government; they viewed the Defiance Campaign as "communist inspired" and a "threat to law and order". This event gave the government cause to introduce tighter controls. The Criminal Law Amendment Act allowed for individuals to be banned without trial, and the Public Safety Act allowed the government to suspend rule of law. With more restrictions put in place, the ANC leaders decided to end the campaign in January 1953.

Prior to the Campaign, the ANC's membership numbered 25,000 in 1951. After the conclusion of the Campaign in 1953, it had increased to 100,000. For the first time African, Indian, and Coloured communities across the country acted in concert. The Defiance Campaign would lead to the formation of the Congress Alliance in 1954, a front of multiracial organizations that sought to end apartheid. The campaign was also praised for its absence of violence, considering the extent of the campaign as well as the frustration among the protestors. Due to Luthuli's role in the Defiance Campaign, he was given an ultimatum by the government to choose between his work as a chief at Umvoti or his affiliation with the ANC. He refused to choose, and the government deposed him as chief in November 1952.

President-General of the ANC 
In December 1952, Albert Luthuli was elected president general of the ANC with the support of the ANC Youth League and African communists. The members elected Nelson Mandela as Luthuli's deputy. Moroka's departure and Luthuli's election victory once again brought to the fore the ANCYL's support for a candidate they believed would implement their programmes and goals.

Luthuli led the ANC in its most difficult years; many of his executive members, such as Secretary-General Walter Sisulu, Moses Kotane, JB Marks, and David Bopape were either to be banned or imprisoned. The 1950s saw a further decline in the civil liberties of black people with the Treason Trial and the enactment of the Suppression of Communism Act, which gave the police inordinate power over government critics.

First ban 
On 30 May 1953, the government banned Luthuli for a year, prohibiting him from attending any political or public gatherings and from entering major cities. He was confined to small-population centres and private meetings for the rest of 1953. The legal basis of banning orders fell under the Riotous Assemblies Act and the Criminal Law Amendment Act. It was the first of four banning orders that Luthuli would receive as President-General of the ANC. Following the expiration of his ban, Luthuli continued to attend and speak at numerous anti-apartheid conferences.

Second ban 
In mid-1954, following the expiration of his ban, Luthuli was due to lead a protest in the Transvaal against the Western Areas Removals, a government scheme where close to 75,000 Africans were forced to move from Sophiatown and other townships. As he stepped off of his plane in Johannesburg, the Special Branch handed him two new more severe banning orders, not only prohibiting the attendance of meetings but confining him to the Groutville area for two years until July 1956.

Congress of the People and Freedom Charter

Proposed by Z. K. Matthews in 1953, The Congress of the People was envisioned as a large democratic convention where all South Africans would be invited to create a Freedom Charter. Despite complaints within the ANC by Africanists who believed the ANC should not work with other races, Luthuli contributed to the creation of the Congress Alliance. Led by the ANC, the alliance included the South African Indian Congress, Coloured Peoples Conference, Federation of South African Women, Congress of Trade Unions, and the Congress of Democrats. Luthuli viewed the multiracial organization as a means to bring freedom to South Africa. After convening a secret meeting due to Luthuli's ban, the Congress of the People took place in Kliptown, Johannesburg, in June 1955.

Inspired by the values held in the United States Constitution and the UN Declaration of Human Rights, the Congress of the People developed the Freedom Charter, a list of demands for a democratic, multi-racial, and free South Africa. While well-received by the attendants of the Congress of the People, the Africanist bloc of the ANC rejected it. They opposed the multiracial nature of the charter and what they perceived as communist principles. Luthuli admitted that the Charter had socialist clauses but denied that it reflected a Soviet Union-style of communism. The ANC would ratify the Charter at a special conference one year after it was ratified by the Congress of the People.

Luthuli was not able to attend the Congress of the People or the framing of the Freedom Charter due to a stroke and heart attack as well as the banning order that restricted him to Groutville. In his absence, he was bestowed the honour of the Isitwalandwe, which would be awarded to individuals who distinguished themselves in the struggle for freedom in South Africa.

Treason Trial 

After his second banning order expired in July 1956, he was arrested on 5 December and detained during the preliminary Treason Trial hearings in 1957. Luthuli was one of 156 leaders who were arrested on charges of high treason due to their opposition to apartheid and the Nationalist Party government. High treason carried the death penalty. One of the main charges against the African National Congress leaders were that they were involved in a communist conspiracy to overthrow the government. The charge of communist domination was familiar to opponents of apartheid, and Luthuli frequently brushed off the claim.

The period covered by the charges were from 1 October 1952 to 13 December 1956, including the Defiance Campaign, Sophiatown removals protest, and the Congress of the People. After the preparatory examination period started on 19 December 1956, all accused were released on bail. The pre-trial examination concluded in December 1957 and charges against 65 of the accused were dropped with Luthuli among the acquitted. In August 1958, the Treason Trial proper began with 91 of the remaining accused on trial. By 1959, only thirty of the accused remained. The trial concluded on 29 March 1961 as all of the remaining defendants were found not guilty.

Many of the lawyers who defended the accused were drawn by him and Z. K. Matthews being on trial. Their involvement helped in arousing the opinion of people around the world who sympathized with the accused. The impression that Luthuli made on the foreigners who came to observe the trial led his name to be suggested for the Nobel Peace Prize.

Third ban and banning of the ANC 

On 25 May 1959, the government served Luthuli his third banning order, which lasted for five years. This ban prevented Luthuli from attending any meeting held within South Africa and confined him to his home district. Luthuli's democratic values had been recognized by many white South Africans, and he had gained a minor celebrity status among certain sects of white people, which caused the government to view him with more contempt. When news of his ban spread, supporters of all races gathered to bid farewell to Luthuli.

While still under a banning order, the ANC, led by Luthuli, announced an anti-pass campaign beginning at the end of March. The recently created Pan-Africanist Congress, who split away from the ANC due to their multi-racial alliances and led by Robert Sobukwe, decided to jump ahead of the ANC's planned protest by ten days. On 21 March the PAC called for all African men to go to police stations and surrender their pass. The peaceful march in Sharpeville ended with sixty-nine people killed by police fire. Along with three people killed in Langa. Luthuli and several other ANC leaders ceremoniously burned their passbooks in protest against the Sharpeville massacre. Following a state of emergency and the passing of the Unlawful Organisations Act, the government banned the PAC and the ANC. Luthuli and other political leaders were arrested and found guilty of burning their passbooks. He received a fine of 100 pounds and a sentence of six months in jail, which was suspended for three years on the condition that he was not convicted of a similar offense during that timeframe.

Following his return from prison back to Groutville, Luthuli's power began to wane due to the banning of the ANC and the banning and imprisonment of supporting leaders, his health beginning to decline after a previous stroke and heart attack, and the rise of members in the ANC advocating for an armed struggle. Duma Nokwe, Walter Sisulu, and Nelson Mandela, who had provided leadership for the ANC during South Africa's state of emergency, were determined to take the ANC into new terrain. In May 1961, following a strike, they believed that "traditional weapons of protest… were no longer appropriate." They constantly evaluated whether the conditions were favourable to launch an armed struggle.

uMkhonto we Sizwe 

During a NEC Working Group session in June 1961, Deputy President-General Mandela urged the ANC to adopt armed self-defense methods. He argued that bans on the ANC and their nonviolent methods had altered their goals, and the ANC should adapt new strategies for their new underground conditions and draw inspiration from Algeria, Vietnam, and Cuba. Mandela argued that the ANC was the only anti-apartheid organization that had the capacity to adopt an armed struggle and if they didn't take the lead, they would fall behind in their own movement.

In July 1961, the ANC and Congress Alliance met to hold debates during an ANC NEC meeting surrounding the feasibility of Nelson Mandela's proposal of armed self-defence. Luthuli did not support an armed struggle as he believed the ANC members were ill-prepared without modern firearms and battlefield experience. In a following meeting a day later, a contentious back-and-forth arose. Supporters of armed defence believed the ANC was afraid and running from a physical fight while others believed counter violence would provoke the government into arresting and killing them.

While Luthuli did not support an armed struggle, he also did not oppose it. According to Mandela, Luthuli suggested "two separate streams of the struggle": the ANC, which would remain nonviolent, and a "military movement [that] should be a separate and independent organ, linked to the ANC and under the overall control of the ANC, but fundamentally autonomous". Umkhonto we Sizwe became part of a turn to armed struggle in Southern Africa with similar units to be created in South West Africa, Mozambique, and Southern Rhodesia in the early 1960s. The stated goal of uMkhonto we Sizwe was to cripple South Africa's economy without bloodshed and force the government into negotiating. Mandela explained to Luthuli that only attacks against military installations, transportation links, and power plants would be carried out, which reassured Luthuli's fears of the potential of loss of life.

Nobel Peace Prize 

In October 1961, under his third ban, Luthuli was informed that he was awarded the 1960 Nobel Peace Prize for his fight against apartheid with nonviolent methods. He became the first African-born recipient. The New York Times reported that Dr. Andrew Vance McCracken, an editor of a congregational church magazine, had nominated him. The nomination was then supported by socialist members of parliament in Norway who put his name forward in February 1961.

The award propelled Luthuli from relative obscurity into a global celebrity. Congratulatory letters from the leaders of twenty-five different countries, including American president John F. Kennedy, poured in. In Groutville, journalists lined up to interview Luthuli who dedicated the award to the ANC and expressed gratitude to his wife Nokukhanya. He also used his newfound status as a global podium, and he pleaded to the UN and South Africa's trading partners to impose sanctions on Verwoerd's government. His comments to the press made the world focus on apartheid and its effects on Africans. During Luthuli's Nobel Peace Prize speech he spoke about the contribution of people among all races to find a peaceful solution to South Africa's race problem. He went on to speak of how the "true patriots" of South Africa would not be satisfied until there were full democratic rights for everyone, equal opportunity, and the abolition of racial barriers. Norwegian newspaper Arbeiderbladet described the effect of Luthuli's visit claiming: "We have suddenly begun to feel Africa's nearness and greatness." The Times described the deep impression that Luthuli made on the global stage following his appeal to end racial discrimination and establish an equal South Africa. The day after Luthuli returned to South Africa from the award ceremony, uMkhonto we Sizwe launched their first operations on 16 December 1961.

The attitude of South Africa's government as well as many White South Africans was hostile. Luthuli still had to apply for permission to receive the prize in Oslo, Norway on 10 December 1961. Minister of the Interior, Jan de Klerk initially refused to issue Luthuli a passport but after intense domestic and international pressure, the government finally issued him one. After he was granted permission and received his award, Eric Louw, the Minister of Foreign Affairs, rejected Luthuli's demands for universal suffrage and claimed that Luthuli's speech justified the government restricting his movement within South Africa. The government-operated South African Broadcasting Corporation aired a defamatory broadcast about Luthuli. Volksblad argued the way Luthuli had "grasped every opportunity to besmirch South Africa was shocking". The Star stated: "Mr. Luthuli demands a universal franchise, which is just as silly as restricting the vote to people of one colour and he asks the world to apply sanctions to his own country, which is as reckless and damaging as has been another leader's (HF Verwoerd) impetuous withdrawal from the commonwealth. Neither speaks for the authentic South African". The belief that qualified franchise could be extended to Africans without accepting a democracy based on "one person, one vote" was a popular view among the majority of White South Africans.

Some White South Africans, including parliamentarian Jan Steytler and the Pietermaritzburg City Council, congratulated Luthuli. The white-run newspaper the Natal Daily News described him as "a man with moral and intellectual qualities that have earned him the respect of the world and a position of leadership". They also urged the government to "listen to the voice of responsible African opinion". South African author and Liberal Party leader Alan Paton concluded that Luthuli was "the only man in South Africa who could lead both the left and the right... both Africans and non-Africans".

International popularity 
Following his Nobel Peace Prize win, Luthuli was in a position of international renown for his nonviolence despite the concurrent sabotage operations of uMkhonto we Sizwe. On 22 October 1962, University of Glasgow students elected Luthuli as Lord Rector in recognition of his "dignity and restraint". The rectorship position was honorary. Luthuli's role would have been chair of the university court, the university's executive body, which met monthly. Students elected Luthuli knowing he would serve in absentia. Although ceremonial, Luthuli's election was significant as he was the first African and first non-white person to be nominated as Rector. Apart from a phone call by a student representative after his election, Luthuli never acted as Rector; media reports indicated that no correspondences from the University reached him aside from the notification that he was elected. The South African government allegedly intercepted all mail from the University to Luthuli, an allegation the government denied.

Luthuli's adherence to nonviolence also had support from his friend and civil rights activist Martin Luther King Jr., who commended Luthuli's reputation and spoke of his admiration for Luthuli's "dedication to the cause of freedom and dignity". In September 1962, King and Luthuli had issued the Appeal For Action Against Apartheid organized by the American Committee on Africa, which boosted solidarity between the anti-apartheid and civil rights movements and urged Americans to protest apartheid through nonviolent measures such as boycotts. In 1964, King became the youngest Nobel Peace Prize winner receiving the award for his nonviolent activism against racial discrimination, similar to Luthuli. En route to the 1964 Oslo ceremony to accept his award, he stopped in London to give an "Address on South African Independence." The audience included Luthuli's exiled compatriots, citizens of different African countries, and human rights advocates from India, Pakistan, the West Indies, and the United States. King compared the racism in America to South Africa stating: "clearly there is much in Mississippi and Alabama to remind South Africans of their own country." He praised Luthuli for his leadership and identified "with those in a far more deadly struggle for freedom in South Africa." King predicted that if the United States and the United Kingdom, specifically, withdrew all trade and economically divested from South Africa, "then apartheid would be brought to an end." During King's Nobel Peace Prize acceptance speech on 10 December 1964, Luthuli received a special mention. King called Luthuli a "pilot" of the freedom movement and claimed South Africa was the "most brutal expression of man's inhumanity to man".

Artist Ronald Harrison, 22 years old at the time, unveiled his painting, The Black Christ, in 1962. Harrison portrayed Luthuli as Christ crucified on a cross. The painting was unveiled in St. Luke's Anglican Church in Salt River with the permission of Archbishop de Blank. The painting garnered controversy across South Africa. Along with Christ being depicted as Black, the two Roman soldiers resembled Prime Minister H. F. Verwoerd and Minister of Justice John Vorster. Minister of the Interior, Jan de Klerk, ordered the painting to be taken down and Harrison to appear before the Censorship Board. The Censorship Board banned the painting and ruled that it offended religious sensibilities. Following a documentary about the painting that aired on the American television network CBS, the government ordered the painting to be destroyed. Danish and Swedish supporters of the anti-apartheid movement smuggled the painting to the United Kingdom where, under Anglican prist John Collins' supervision, its display raised money for the International Defence and Aid Fund, a fund created to defend political prisoners. Harrison was arrested and tortured by the Special Branch who intended on discovering who Harrison collaborated with to paint and display The Black Christ. He would later serve eight years of house arrest on charges related to his painting. Luthuli desired to meet Harrison after learning of his painting and its significance, and the Norwegian Embassy arranged a visit for Harrison to Luthuli. Norwegians took Harrison from Cape Town to Durban. Under clandestine circumstances, Harrison met Luthuli in Groutville.

Fourth ban 
Effective 31 May 1964, John Vorster, the Minister of Justice, issued Luthuli a more severe banning order than the one he received in 1959. Unlike the previous ban, the new ban prevented Luthuli from traveling to the closest town of Stanger until 31 May 1969, had he not died before then. Vorster was confident that Luthuli's activism furthered communism and issued a warning for him not to publish any statements, make contact with banned individuals, or speak at meetings. NUSAS, the Liberal Party, and the International Confederation of Free Trade Unions publicly protested this banning. Luthuli became increasingly isolated from the ANC as a result of his ban but managed to transmit his messages to the world through visitors such as United States Senator Robert F. Kennedy. During Kennedy's 1966 tour of South Africa, he criticiqued white South Africa's racism and labelled apartheid as an abandonment of all that western civilization holds sacred. He later flew by helicopter to Groutville to visit Luthuli where they discussed the anti-apartheid and civil rights movements. Kennedy would later give a press conference where he would describe Luthuli as one of the most impressive men he ever met.

Evidence suggests Luthuli's political life and physical health were declining. From October 1964 to his death in July 1967, the only materials produced by Luthuli's hand were sermon notes and medical reminders on scraps of paper. These notes from Luthuli reveal that the last six months of his life were most likely insular and exclusively focused on religion. No definitive conclusion can be taken away from these writings; however, it appeared Luthuli's mental health also began to deteriorate as his later writings could hardly be deciphered. The lack of archival records of Luthuli's last two years of life and his deteriorating penmanship indicate that he was not active as the President-General of the ANC. Newspaper articles published in 1967 claimed that Luthuli was not able to do much reading or writing and he spent most of his time listening to the radio. The scraps of paper written by Luthuli before his death would confirm this. The Sunday Times reported that Luthuli had undergone surgery to his left eye, which had troubled him for many years and had been "useless" since Luthuli's stroke in 1955. It caused him considerable pain to the point where doctors were discussing whether the eye should be removed. Other newspapers suggested that more than an eye troubled Luthuli. He remained in the hospital for four weeks, and other health issues most likely prolonged his stay. The drafting and signing of Luthuli's will prior to his hospitalization challenged the long-held position that he was in good health at the time of his death.

Death 
On Friday 21 July 1967, Luthuli left his house at 08:30 and informed his wife that he would be walking to his store near Gledhow train station. Luthuli would travel from his house to his store and vice-versa daily. An hour later at 09:30, he arrived at his store where he delivered a package to his employee. Luthuli grew sugar cane half a mile away from the Umvoti River railway bridge, and since 06:30, two men and a woman were working in his field. Around 10:00,  Luthuli left his store and told his store employee that he was going to his field, and would return later. Forty minutes later Luthuli crossed the river again to return to his store without having met with any of his field workers. On his way back to his store, Luthuli was struck by a goods train.

At 10:29, a goods train pulled by a locomotive left Stanger for Durban. Aboard the train were the driver, conductor, and direman. At 10:36 the train passed Gledhow station without stopping. Two minutes later at 10:38, the train began to cross the Umvoti River railway bridge. Someone entering the bridge would have passed a sign that read, "Cross This Bridge At Their Own Risk" in English and Afrikaans. The driver indicated in his testimony that he blew the whistle from the time he saw Luthuli walking towards the train until the train hit him. The driver exclaimed to the fireman that the train had hit someone, and the driver testified that he immediately applied the brakes and brought the train to a halt. The driver and the fireman left the train and attended to Luthuli, who was still alive and breathing despite having received head injuries. Luthuli was brought to Stanger Hospital at approximately 11:50, where the Senior Medical Superintendent described his condition as "semi-conscious" and "bleeding freely" due to injuries sustained to his head.

For two and a half hours, from 11:50 to 14:20, the doctors treated Luthuli's wounds by giving a blood transfusion and providing heart stimulant medication. Around 13:00, Luthuli's son, Christian, arrived at the hospital to see Luthuli who was still conscious. Nokukhanya received news from Christian of Luthuli's possible transfer to King Edward VIII Hospital in Durban, where she attempted to search for him. At Stanger Hospital, Luthuli's condition started to deteriorate despite treatment. It was then decided to not transfer Luthuli to a different hospital due to his worsening condition. Instead, a neurosurgeon from Durban would come to Stanger Hospital. Upon hearing the news, Nokukhanya traveled to Stanger. At 14:20, neurosurgeon Mauritius Joubert arrived at Stanger Hospital. He found Luthuli in a coma not responding to stimulation. Five minutes after his examination, at 14:25, Luthuli died. Nokukhanya arrived at the hospital five minutes after his death without having said goodbye to him.

Reaction 

After learning of Luthuli's death, people around the world immediately suspected foul play from the South African government. Despite a formal inquest concluding he was killed by a train, speculation remained rampant and still carries on years after his death. Immediately after hearing news of his death, the ANC and its allies suspected the South African government had killed Luthuli. The Zimbabwe African People's Union repeated the same claims in Sechaba, the official organ of the ANC. The Tanganyika African National Union described Luthuli's death as "dubious". In a letter to the ANC, vice-president of FRELIMO, Uria Simango, claimed Luthuli's death was premeditated. Many of Luthuli's family members believe that he was deliberately killed. Daughters Thandeka and Albertinah both maintain that he was murdered in the decades following his death. Albert Luthuli biographer, Scott Everett Couper, states that the myth of Luthuli being killed leads to an inaccurate portrayal of Luthuli, stating: "To say that Luthuli was mysteriously killed is to understand that he still had a vital role in the struggle for liberation at the time of his death, that he was a threat to the apartheid regime. Sadly, Luthuli had long since been considered obsolete by leaders of his own movement and he had little contact with those imprisoned, banned or exiled. Since Sharpeville... Luthuli served only as the honorary, emeritus, titular leader of the ANC".

See also 
 International Fellowship of Reconciliation
 List of black Nobel laureates
 List of people subject to banning orders under apartheid

Notes

Citations

References 

 
 
 
 
 
 
 
 
 
 
 
 

1898 births
1967 deaths
Anti-apartheid activists
Nobel Peace Prize laureates
Nonviolence advocates
People acquitted of treason
Presidents of the African National Congress
Railway accident deaths in South Africa
Rectors of the University of Glasgow
South African autobiographers
South African Christians
South African Congregationalists
South African Nobel laureates
Zulu people